The following is a list of Pabstiella species accepted by the Plants of the World Online as of February 2021.

Pabstiella acrogenia 
Pabstiella alligatorifera 
Pabstiella analoga 
Pabstiella arcuata 
Pabstiella armeniaca 
Pabstiella aryter 
Pabstiella atrata 
Pabstiella aurantiaca 
Pabstiella aveniformis 
Pabstiella bacillaris 
Pabstiella biriricensis 
Pabstiella bofiae 
Pabstiella brachystele 
Pabstiella bradei 
Pabstiella brasilica 
Pabstiella calcarata 
Pabstiella calimanii 
Pabstiella campestris 
Pabstiella capijumensis 
Pabstiella caraguatatubensis 
Pabstiella carinifera 
Pabstiella carrisii 
Pabstiella castellensis 
Pabstiella catafestae 
Pabstiella colorata 
Pabstiella conceicionensis 
Pabstiella conspersa 
Pabstiella cordilabia 
Pabstiella crassicaulis 
Pabstiella curti-bradei 
Pabstiella dasilvae 
Pabstiella decurva 
Pabstiella deltoglossa 
Pabstiella determannii 
Pabstiella discors 
Pabstiella dracula 
Pabstiella elegantula 
Pabstiella ephemera 
Pabstiella eunapolitana 
Pabstiella fasciata 
Pabstiella fluminensis 
Pabstiella fragae 
Pabstiella freyi 
Pabstiella fusca 
Pabstiella garayi 
Pabstiella ghillanyi 
Pabstiella glandulipetala 
Pabstiella gossameri 
Pabstiella gracilicaulis 
Pabstiella granulosa 
Pabstiella henrique-aragonii 
Pabstiella ibiunensis 
Pabstiella ignota 
Pabstiella imbeana 
Pabstiella integripetala 
Pabstiella intraptila 
Pabstiella isabelae 
Pabstiella juquitibensis 
Pabstiella lacerticeps 
Pabstiella laxiflora 
Pabstiella leucopyramis 
Pabstiella lineolata 
Pabstiella lingua 
Pabstiella lobiglossa 
Pabstiella lueriana 
Pabstiella marinsiensis 
Pabstiella matinhensis 
Pabstiella melior 
Pabstiella menegattii 
Pabstiella miniatolineolata 
Pabstiella mirabilis 
Pabstiella miragliae 
Pabstiella muricatifolia 
Pabstiella naimekei 
Pabstiella novabelenensis 
Pabstiella nymphalis 
Pabstiella osculator 
Pabstiella pandurifera 
Pabstiella pantherina 
Pabstiella parvifolia 
Pabstiella pellifeloidis 
Pabstiella piraquarensis 
Pabstiella pleurothalloides 
Pabstiella pomerana 
Pabstiella pristeoglossa 
Pabstiella pseudotrifida 
Pabstiella punctatifolia 
Pabstiella purpurea 
Pabstiella quadridentata 
Pabstiella quasi 
Pabstiella ramphastorhyncha 
Pabstiella recurviloba 
Pabstiella rhombilabia 
Pabstiella ribeironensis 
Pabstiella robertoi 
Pabstiella rubrolineata 
Pabstiella rupicola 
Pabstiella ruschii 
Pabstiella sansonii 
Pabstiella sarcopetala 
Pabstiella savioi 
Pabstiella seriata 
Pabstiella setibensis 
Pabstiella silvanae 
Pabstiella sordida 
Pabstiella sparsiflora 
Pabstiella spathuliglossa 
Pabstiella stictophylla 
Pabstiella syringodes 
Pabstiella tabacina 
Pabstiella tenera 
Pabstiella teschiana 
Pabstiella transparens 
Pabstiella tricolor 
Pabstiella trifida 
Pabstiella trimeropetala 
Pabstiella tripterantha 
Pabstiella truncatilabia 
Pabstiella truncicola 
Pabstiella uniflora 
Pabstiella varellae 
Pabstiella vellozoana 
Pabstiella verboonenii 
Pabstiella versicolor 
Pabstiella villosisepala 
Pabstiella viridula 
Pabstiella wacketii 
Pabstiella wanderbildtiana 
Pabstiella wawraeana 
Pabstiella yauaperyensis

References

 
Pabstiella